Yo, indocumentada is a 2013 Venezuelan documentary film directed by Andrea Baranenko. The film is about three Venezuelan transgender women and their efforts to be legally recognized in the country, including being able to change their legal name.

Plot 
The film focuses in three Venezuelan transgender women: Tamara Adrián (a lawyer), Desiree (a hairdresser) and Victoria (an art student) and chronicles their efforts to be legally recognized in the country, including being able to change their legal name, through a series of legal actions, as well as demand their right to an identity, in a society where machismo and transphobia are still rooted. Tamara, one of the protagonists, is a law professor at the Andrés Bello Catholic University who despite her countless academic recognitions and honors in Venezuela and in France she has not been able to win her legal battle. The documentary also depicts the social and legal exclusion that the LGBT community in Venezuela faces.

Reception 
The film represented Venezuela and was part of the 2013 official selection of the United Nations Association Film Festival (UNAFF).

See also 

 Venezuelan LGBT+ cinema

References

External links 

 
 Yo, indocumentada at UNAFF
 Yo, indocumentada at Film Affinity
 Yo, indocumentada at Cine Mestizo
 Yo, indocumentada's entry at Una Flor Autónoma, Andrea Baranenko blog

2013 films
Films about trans women
Venezuelan documentary films
Venezuelan LGBT-related films
2010s Spanish-language films
2013 LGBT-related films
Documentary films about Venezuela